Mordellistena bistrigosa is a beetle in the genus Mordellistena of the family Mordellidae. It was described in 1941 by Pic.

References

bistrigosa
Beetles described in 1941